Diealright (Korean: 다이얼라잇), often stylized as DIEALRIGHT, is a post punk band from Seoul, Korea. Consisting of lead vocalist and guitarist Chae Song Hwa, bass guitarist Kim Seung Il, and drummer Baek Soojung, the band debuted in 2014. Since then, they have released two singles, and EP and an album. The album presentation showcase was held in Club Freebird in Hongdae. The band played their first European tour dates in the summer of 2017.

Singer Chae was previously in Midnight Smokin' Drive and the all-female punk rock band Rule Destroyer.

Band members 
 Chae Song Hwa: lead vocals, guitar, keyboards
 Kim Seung Il: bass guitar, guitar, backing vocals
 Baek Soojung: drums, backing vocals (2014-2017)

Discography

Albums

EPs

Singles

Notable festivals 
 Zandari Festa 2017, 2016, 2015
 Primavera Sound 2017
 Liverpool Sound City 2017

References 

South Korean indie rock groups
Musical groups from Seoul
Musical groups established in 2014
2014 establishments in South Korea